The 1984 California Angels season involved the Angels finishing 2nd in the American League west with a record of 81 wins and 81 losses.

Offseason 
 November 22, 1983: Rod Carew was signed as a free agent with the California Angels.
 December 19, 1983: Curt Brown was traded by the Angels to the New York Yankees for Mike Browning (minors).
 February 6, 1984: Rob Picciolo was signed as a free agent with the California Angels.

Regular season 
 September 17, 1984: In a game against the Kansas City Royals, Reggie Jackson hit the 500th home run of his career. It was the 17th anniversary of the day he hit his first home run. Jackson hit his 500th, at Anaheim Stadium off Bud Black of the Royals.
September 30, 1984: Mike Witt throws a perfect game against the Texas Rangers, recording the only perfect game in franchise history.

Season standings

Record vs. opponents

Transactions 
 June 4, 1984: Dante Bichette was drafted by the Angels in the 17th round of the 1984 Major League Baseball draft. Player signed June 8, 1984.
 August 2, 1984: Ron Jackson was released by the California Angels.

Roster

Game log

Regular season

|-

|-style=background:#fbb
| 35 || May 11 || 4:35p.m. PDT || @ Tigers || 2–8 || Wilcox (4–0) || Witt (4–2) || Hernández (4) || 2:55 || 44,187 || 18–17 || L5
|-style=background:#cfc
| 38 || May 12 || 10:20a.m. PDT || @ Tigers || 4–2 || John (3–3) || Berenguer (2–2) || – || 2:32 || 38,516 || 19–17 || W1
|-style=background:#bbb
| — || May 13 || || @ Tigers || colspan=8 | Postponed (Rain) (Makeup date: August 14)
|-style=background:#fbb
| 43 || May 22 || 7:30p.m. PDT || Tigers || 1–3 || Berenguer (3–2) || Witt (4–4) || López (6) || 2:53 || 41,253 || 23–20 || L1
|-style=background:#fbb
| 44 || May 23 || 7:30p.m. PDT || Tigers || 2–4 || Petry (7–1) || LaCorte (0–2) || Hernández (7) || 2:39 || 41,205 || 23–21 || L2
|-style=background:#fbb
| 45 || May 24 || 7:30p.m. PDT || Tigers || 1–5 || Morris (9–1) || Slaton (1–2) || – || 2:14 || 43,580 || 23–22 || L3
|-

|-

|-style=background:#bbbfff
|colspan="12"|55th All-Star Game in San Francisco, CA
|-

|-style=background:#cfc
| 117 || August 14 || 2:35p.m. PDT || @ Tigers || 6–4 || Aase (2–1) || Hernández (6–2) || Sánchez (11) || 2:53 || N/A || 60–57 || W2
|-style=background:#cfc
| 118 || August 14 || 6:03p.m. PDT || @ Tigers || 12–1 || Kison (3–1) || Rozema (7–4) || – || 2:33 || 38,597 || 61–57 || W3
|-style=background:#fbb
| 119 || August 15 || 4:35p.m. PDT || @ Tigers || 3–8 || Petry (15–5) || John (7–10) || – || 2:46 || 33,940 || 61–58 || L1
|-style=background:#fbb
| 120 || August 16 || 10:30a.m. PDT || @ Tigers || 7–8  || Hernández (7–2) || Curtis (0–1) || – || 4:02 || 37,779 || 61–59 || L2
|-style=background:#cfc
| 127 || August 24 || 7:30p.m. PDT || Tigers || 5–3 || Witt (12–10) || Petry (15–7) || Aase (4) || 2:33 || 41,459 || 63–64 || W2
|-style=background:#fbb
| 128 || August 25 || 7:00p.m. PDT || Tigers || 1–5 || Morris (17–8) || Kison (3–3) || – || 2:40 || 51,203 || 63–65 || L1
|-style=background:#fbb
| 129 || August 26 || 1:00p.m. PDT || Tigers || 12–6 || Wilcox (15–7) || John (7–12) || – || 3:01 || 33,008 || 63–66 || L2
|-

|-

|- style="text-align:center;"
| Legend:       = Win       = Loss       = PostponementBold = Angels team member

Player stats

Batting

Starters by position 
Note: Pos = Position; G = Games played; AB = At bats; H = Hits; Avg. = Batting average; HR = Home runs; RBI = Runs batted in

Other batters 
Note: G = Games played; AB = At bats; H = Hits; Avg. = Batting average; HR = Home runs; RBI = Runs batted in

Pitching

Starting pitchers 
Note: G = Games pitched; IP = Innings pitched; W = Wins; L = Losses; ERA = Earned run average; SO = Strikeouts

Other pitchers 
Note: G = Games pitched; IP = Innings pitched; W = Wins; L = Losses; ERA = Earned run average; SO = Strikeouts

Relief pitchers 
Note: G = Games pitched; W = Wins; L = Losses; SV = Saves; ERA = Earned run average; SO = Strikeouts

Farm system 

LEAGUE CHAMPIONS: Edmonton

Notes

References

External links 
1984 California Angels at Baseball Reference
1984 California Angels  at Baseball Almanac

Los Angeles Angels seasons
Los